Long Pine Creek is a stream in Rock and Brown counties, Nebraska, in the United States.

Long Pine Creek was named from the dense growth of pine trees along its banks.

See also

List of rivers of Nebraska

References

Rivers of Brown County, Nebraska
Rivers of Rock County, Nebraska
Rivers of Nebraska